Arthur Henry Bromley-Davenport (29  October 1867 – 15 December 1946), better known as A. Bromley Davenport, was an English actor born in Baginton, Warwickshire, England, UK.

Bromley-Davenport made appearances in at least 77 films for television and cinema between 1920 and 1944. He was known publicly as Bromley Davenport and in the film credits, his Christian name was always abbreviated.

Perhaps the most commercial films he appeared in were Jamaica Inn and The Way Ahead, in which his character was named after his real life name. He did not often have a lead role, but in the television drama Magic, he took the lead role as Duke.

Personal life 

Bromley Davenport was a member of the Bromley-Davenport family of Macclesfield, Cheshire. He was the youngest son of the politician William Bromley-Davenport and the brother of William Bromley-Davenport, a British Army officer, England footballer, and Conservative politician.

He was educated at Eton College, Berkshire. In 1886, he married Elizabeth Light. In 1921, he married Madame Adele Burdillat of Nice, France. He was 79 when he died in London in 1946.

Filmography

 The Great Gay Road (1920) - Sir Crispin Vickrey
 The Bigamist (1921) - Richard Carruthers
 The Persistent Lovers (1922) - Duke of Harborough
 Boy Woodburn (1922) - Matt Woodburn
 Fox Farm (1922) - Sam Wetherall
 Running Water (1922) - Capt. Barstow
 A Maid of the Silver Sea (1922) - Old Tom Hamon
 The Starlit Garden (1923) - Col Grangerson
 Bonnie Prince Charlie (1923) - Sir John Cope
 Sally Bishop (1924) - Landlord
 Eugene Aram (1924) - Cpl. Bunting
 What the Butler Saw (1924) - General Dunlop
 Somebody's Darling (1925) - Sleeper
 Roses of Picardy (1927) - Baron d'Archeville
 The Glad Eye (1927) - Galipau
 The Fake (1927) - Hesketh Pointer
 A Sister to Assist 'Er (1927) - Jim Harris
 The Flight Commander (1927) - Philosopher
 Glorious Youth (1928) - Sam Duffield
 The Blue Peter (1928) - Mr. Callaghan
 Spangles (1928) - Romanovitch
 The American Prisoner (1929) - Squire Malherb
 Too Many Crooks (1930, Short) - The Man Upstairs
 Leave It to Me (1930, Short) - Mr. Jordan
 Captivation (1931) - Colonel Jordan
 Glamour (1931) - Lord Belton
 Mischief (1931)
 The Marriage Bond (1932) - MFH
 Self Made Lady (1932) - Duke of Alchester
 Mr. Bill the Conqueror (1932) - Lord Blagden
 Flat No. 9 (1932, Short) - Caretaker
 When London Sleeps (1932) - Colonel Graham
 The Return of Raffles (1932) - Sir John Truwode
 Money Means Nothing (1932) - Earl of Massingham
 The Face at the Window (1932) - Gaston de Brisson
 Lord Camber's Ladies (1932) - Sir Bedford Slufter
 The Iron Stair (1933) - Sir Andrew Gale
 The Wishbone (1933) - Harry Stammer
 The Melody-Maker (1933) - Jenks
 Dora (1933, Short) - Judge
 Enemy of the Police (1933) - Sir Lemuel Tapleigh
 A Shot in the Dark (1933) - Peter Browne
 The Pointing Finger (1933) - Lord Edensore
 The Stolen Necklace (1933) - Priest
 Little Miss Nobody (1933) - Mr. Romary
 Lily of Killarney (1934) - Lord Kenmore (uncredited)
 The Warren Case (1934) - Sir Richard Clavering
 Love, Life and Laughter (1934) - Menkenburg
 Lost in the Legion (1934) - Colonel
 The Scarley Pimpernel (1934)- French innkeeper (Brogard)
 So You Won't Talk (1935) - Mr. Fielding
 Vintage Wine (1935) - Pierre
 The Crouching Beast (1935)
 The Cardinal (1936) - Bramante
 London Melody (1937) - General Taplow
 Owd Bob (1938) - Magistrate - Mr. Parker
 Murder in the Family (1938) - Minor Role (uncredited)
 Second Thoughts (1938) - George Gaunt
 Jamaica Inn (1939) - Ringwood 
 Magic (1939, TV Movie) - The Duke
 The Mysterious Mr. Davis (1939) - Lord Avonmouth
 The Second Mr. Bush (1940) - Colonel Barlow
 The Farmer's Wife (1941) - Henry Coaker
 Love on the Dole (1941) - Pawnbroker (uncredited)
 Old Mother Riley's Ghosts (1941) - Warrender
 Let the People Sing (1942) - Agent
 The Young Mr. Pitt (1942) - Sir Evan Nepean
 Those Kids from Town (1942) - Egworth
 When We Are Married (1943) - Mayor
 The Way Ahead (1944) - Chelsea Pensioner (final film role)

References

External links 
 A. Bromley Davenport (1867-1946). Internet Movie Database.
 The lineage of the Bromley Davenports

English male stage actors
English male film actors
English male silent film actors
1867 births
1946 deaths
People educated at Eton College
20th-century English male actors